Jordan Jeffrey-Joseph Lawlar  (born July 17, 2002) is an American professional baseball shortstop in the Arizona Diamondbacks organization.

Amateur career
Lawlar began playing baseball around age five. He attended Jesuit College Preparatory School of Dallas in Dallas, Texas. He began playing varsity as a sophomore in 2019. As a sophomore, he batted .409 with five home runs, and in 2020, his junior season, he hit .485 with one home run and 13 RBIs over 12 games before the season ended due to the COVID-19 pandemic. That summer, he played in the Perfect Game All-American Classic, and was named the Jackie Robinson Perfect Game Player of the Year. As a senior in 2021, he hit .412 with six home runs, 37 RBIs, and 32 stolen bases. He was subsequently named the Texas Gatorade Baseball Player of the Year. He committed to play college baseball at Vanderbilt University.

Professional career
Lawlar was selected by the Arizona Diamondbacks in the first round with the sixth overall selection of the 2021 Major League Baseball draft. He signed for a bonus of $6.7 million. He made his professional debut with the Rookie-level Arizona Complex League Diamondbacks. After two games, it was announced that he had injured his left shoulder and would be undergoing season-ending surgery.

Lawlar was assigned to the Visalia Rawhide of the Low-A California League to begin the 2022 season. In late May, he was placed on the injured list with a back injury. He returned in mid-June. After batting .351 with nine home runs, 32 RBIs, and 24 stolen bases over 44 games, he was promoted to the Hillsboro Hops of the High-A Northwest League in late July. He was selected to represent the Diamondbacks alongside Corbin Carroll at the 2022 All-Star Futures Game. Lawlar played in thirty games for Hillsboro in which he hit .288 with three home runs, 17 RBIs, and 13 stolen bases before he was promoted to the Amarillo Sod Poodles of the Double-A Texas League. Over twenty games with Amarillo to finish the season, he batted .212 with four home runs and 11 RBIs. He was selected to play in the Arizona Fall League for the Salt River Rafters after the season.

References

External links

Jesuit Rangers bio

2002 births
Living people
People from Irving, Texas
Baseball players from Texas
Baseball shortstops
Arizona Complex League Diamondbacks players
Visalia Rawhide players
Hillsboro Hops players
Amarillo Sod Poodles players
Jesuit College Preparatory School of Dallas alumni